The Khancheyskoye gas field is a natural gas field located in the Yamalo-Nenets Autonomous Okrug. It was discovered in 1990 and developed by and Novatek. It began production in 2001 and produces natural gas and condensates. The total proven reserves of the Khancheyskoye gas field are around 1.151 trillion cubic feet (32.6×109m³), and production is slated to be around 347.7 million cubic feet/day (9.8×105m³) in 2010.

References

Natural gas fields in Russia